The Nokia 6070 is a mobile phone made by Nokia. It operates on GSM tri band frequency 900, 1800 and 1900 MHz (850 and 1900 MHz in the US model), with automatic switching between frequencies. It is small in size with dimensions of 105.4 x 44.3 x 18.6 mm and weights 88 grams. It was released in the second quarter of 2006. The phone runs using Nokia S40 second edition. The features include a VGA camera, FM radio and voice recording.

Key features 
 128x160 CSTN display
 MMS (max. 150 kb)
 SMS
 GPRS and WAP 2.0 services
 EDGE (Enhanced Data rates for GSM Evolution) compatibility
 Address book, calendar, and reminders
 Java ME
 Push-to-talk
 xHTML web browser
 E-mail support for POP3 and IMAP4 networks
 Integrated VGA camera for taking videos and still images
 FM radio (with headset)
 Infrared
 Nokia Series 40 Theme compatibility
 Loud speaker (can be used for calls)
 Pop-port connector
 Synchronisation support
 Instant messaging
 Next G Networking

Supported media formats 
 Images: .bmp, .jpg, .gif, .png, .tiff
 Tones: .nrt (Nokia Ringing Tune), .mid, .mp3, .amr
 Video: .3gp
 Themes: .nth (Nokia Themes)
 Applications: .jar
 Web pages: XHTML, HTML

Known issues 
 When installing applications whose size is 130-150kb using the Nokia PC suite, an error message appears saying that the file is too large to be installed on the phone although the maximum size that can be installed on the Nokia 6070 is 150kb. Applications which have a size of 130-150kb can be installed via OTA (over-the-air) download using GPRS.
 Sometimes, when the phone is using GPRS and the memory is about to become full (due to the internet cache being enabled), the phone crashes and White Screen of Death appears.
 When accessing the text message inbox whilst receiving a text message at the same time, the phone crashes and the White Screen of Death appears.
 Some users reported that they got a Nickel allergy because of too much exposure of the user's fingers to the navigation key which is made from nickel although, it is documented in the user's manual that users must avoid too much exposure to nickel which may lead to an allergic reaction. Several new Nokia phones in the market use the same navigation key as in Nokia 6070 to presumably cut cost.

Related phones 
 Nokia 5070
 Nokia 6080

External links

Nokia Europe - Nokia 6070 
http://www.gsmarena.com/nokia_6070-1433.php

6070
Mobile phones introduced in 2006
Mobile phones with infrared transmitter